Jo Yoon-hee (born October 13, 1982) is a South Korean actress. She is best known for starring in the television dramas My Husband Got a Family (2012) and Nine (2013).

Personal life
She is originally from Cheongju, Chungcheongbuk-do, but moved to Seoul, the capital of South Korea when she was only 5 years old, where she has lived ever since.

On May 2, 2017, Jo announced that she has registered her marriage with The Gentlemen of Wolgyesu Tailor Shop co-star Lee Dong-gun and they are expecting their first child. 
The couple held a private wedding ceremony on September 29 and welcomed a baby girl on December 14, 2017. On May 28, 2020, it was reported that the two actors had recently gotten divorced due to irreconcilable differences. According to a report by Dispatch, Jo  has received custody of their young daughter.

Filmography

Film

Television series

Variety show

Music video

Awards and nominations

References

External links
  
 
 
 

21st-century South Korean actresses
South Korean television actresses
South Korean film actresses
South Korean female models
Dongduk Women's University alumni
1982 births
Living people
People from Cheongju
King Kong by Starship artists